Clear Creek is a stream in Monroe and Shelby counties in the U.S. state of Missouri. It is a tributary of Crooked Creek.

Clear Creek was so named on account of the clarity of the water it contains.

See also
List of rivers of Missouri

References

Rivers of Monroe County, Missouri
Rivers of Shelby County, Missouri
Rivers of Missouri